The Liberty Korea Party held a leadership election on 3 July 2017. It was the first election since the Liberty Korea Party became an opposition party.

Candidates

Running 
 Shin Sang-jin, member of the National Assembly.
 Hong Jun-pyo, former Governor of South Gyeongsang Province, former member of the National Assembly, former leader of the party, former Floor leader of the party.
 Won Yoo-chul, member of the National Assembly, former Floor leader of the party.

Results 
The ratio of the results by sector was 70% for delegates, 30% for opinion poll.

References 

Liberty Korea Party
Liberty
Liberty